Pseudoruegeria sabulilitoris is a Gram-negative, non-spore-forming, aerobic and non-motile bacterium from the genus of Pseudoruegeria which has been isolated from seashore sand from the Geoje Island in Korea.

References 

Rhodobacteraceae
Bacteria described in 2014